Forrest's rock squirrel (Sciurotamias forresti) is a species of rodent in the family Sciuridae. Relatively little is known about Forrest's rock squirrel, but its behavior is assumed to resemble that of its more widespread relative, Père David's rock squirrel. In appearance, it largely resembles Père David's rock squirrel, but Forrest's rock squirrel is more ochraceous in colour and has a faint whitish line on the side.

References

External links
 Photos of Forrest's rock squirrel

Rodents of China
Sciurotamias
Mammals described in 1922
Taxa named by Oldfield Thomas
Taxonomy articles created by Polbot